Erik Noppi (born 5 March 1970) is a retired Norwegian footballer.

In his early career he played for Fremad, Grue IL and Nybergsund IL. He joined Kongsvinger IL in 1996, and played 39 Norwegian Premier League games over two years. He then joined Skeid Fotball, playing there from 1998 to 2003. After retiring, he found work as a school teacher in Sagene.

References

1970 births
Living people
People from Hedmark
Norwegian footballers
Nybergsund IL players
Kongsvinger IL Toppfotball players
Skeid Fotball players
Eliteserien players
Norwegian First Division players
Association football defenders
Sportspeople from Innlandet